Gerd Wiesemes (born 29 January 1943) is a retired German football defender.

Career

Statistics

1 1964–65 and 1974–75 include the Verbandsliga Westfalen promotion playoffs. 1969–70 and 1970–71 include the Regionalliga promotion playoffs.

References

External links
 

1943 births
Living people
Sportspeople from Bochum
German footballers
Bundesliga players
VfL Bochum players
SC Westfalia Herne players
Association football defenders
Footballers from North Rhine-Westphalia